Šemnice is a municipality and village in Karlovy Vary District in the Karlovy Vary Region of the Czech Republic. It has about 700 inhabitants.

Administrative parts
Villages of Dubina, Pulovice and Sedlečko are administrative parts of Šemnice.

References

Villages in Karlovy Vary